Kevin Coen (1947 – 20 January 1975) was a volunteer in the Sligo Brigade of the Provisional Irish Republican Army (IRA) who was killed in County Fermanagh, Northern Ireland, by the British Army.

Background
Coen was born and grew up in Rusheen, Riverstown, South County Sligo, in the Republic of Ireland.

Paramilitary activity
Coen joined the IRA and served with the Sligo Brigade and was a member of the Southern Command. In 1971, Coen was imprisoned in Mountjoy Prison, Dublin, where he was jailed with fellow Republican Dan Hoban.

At the age of 28, Coen was killed by a British Army soldier while on active service at Cassidy's Cross (also known as Mullan Cross) near Kinawley, a village in the south-west of County Fermanagh in Northern Ireland, close to the County Cavan / County Fermanagh border, on 20 January 1975. The CAIN Sutton Index lists him as being shot during an attempted bus hijacking. However, Republican sources state he was shot on the main Swanlinbar-Enniskillen road by undercover British troops in an unmarked civilian car, who opened fire at an IRA checkpoint.

Coen was the first volunteer from the Southern Command to be killed on active service since Tony Ahern died in May 1973. Ahern, from Cork City, had been killed near Roslea in south-east Fermanagh.

Memorial
Leitrim Republican, John Joe McGirl, gave the oration at his graveside in Sooey, County Sligo. At the graveside of Coen, McGirl stated;
 

The East Sligo Cumann of Sinn Féin is named the Coen/Savage Cumann and the Sligo Cumann of Republican Sinn Féin is named the Noble Six/Kevin Coen Cumann in honour of Coen, and they both hold an annual commemoration at his graveside.

There is an annual lecture given in his name which has been addressed by Caoimhghín Ó Caoláin, Pat Doherty, Pearse Doherty, Aengus Ó Snodaigh and Gerry Adams in recent years.

Roadside memorial to Coen and Crossan at Cassidy's Cross

A roadside monument was erected in 2000 at Cassidy's Cross, Mullan, near Kinawley in south-west Fermanagh, where Coen was killed in January 1975. The monument stands in the townland of Corranaheen, on the side of the Swanlinbar Road, the stretch of the A32 that is the main road from Enniskillen to Swanlinbar. As well as commemorating Coen, this monument also commemorates James Crossan (1932-1958), a Sinn Féin activist who was killed by the RUC near the same spot in August 1958, during the Border Campaign.

Crossan was a native of Aughavas, a hamlet south-west of Carrigallen in South Leitrim. In 1947, upon his father's death, he and his family had moved to Cloneary,
a townland near Bawnboy in West Cavan, where he spent the rest of his life. He was buried in Kilnavart Cemetery, near Bawnboy.

See also
Joseph MacManus

References

1947 births
1975 deaths
Deaths by firearm in Northern Ireland
Irish republicans
People from County Sligo
People killed by security forces during The Troubles (Northern Ireland)
Provisional Irish Republican Army members
Republicans imprisoned during the Northern Ireland conflict